Jennifer C. Daskal (born 1972) is a Professor of Law and Faculty Director of the Tech, Law, Security Program at the Washington College of Law at American University. Her work focuses on terrorism, national security and criminal law. She previously served as senior counsel for Human Rights Watch, focusing on similar issues.  She also worked in the Department of Justice during the Obama administration, which was seeking to prosecute terror suspects through the criminal justice system instead of through military tribunals.

Career
A graduate of Harvard Law School, Cambridge and Brown University and a Marshall Scholar,. Daskal garnered attention after traveling to the countries to which Guantanamo detainees have been released, to verify that those countries are abiding by the undertakings they made to the US Government to respect the returned detainees' human rights.

On February 23, 2010, the New York Post reported that Daskal, Neal Katyal, and three other lawyers who had worked on behalf of the civil rights of Guantanamo captives, had been serving on the Obama administration's task force reviewing the status of the remaining Guantanamo captives.
The paper had first questioned her appointment to the Department of Justice's National Security Division, in July 2009, and then again in January 2010.

Currently, Daskal is a Professor of Law at American University.

In April of 2022, Daskal was announced as a member of the Disinformation Governance Board for the United States Department of Homeland Security.

References

External links

Living people
Harvard Law School alumni
Brown University alumni
1972 births
Place of birth missing (living people)
Alumni of the University of Cambridge
Marshall Scholars